The year 520 BC was a year of the pre-Julian Roman calendar. In the Roman Empire, it was known as year 234 Ab urbe condita. The denomination 520 BC for this year has been used since the early medieval period, when the Anno Domini calendar era became the prevalent method in Europe for naming years.

Events

By place

China 
King Dao becomes king of the Zhou Dynasty of China but dies before the end of the year.

Births 

 Duanmu Ci

Deaths 
King Dao of Zhou, King of the Zhou Dynasty of China
King Jing of Zhou, King of the Zhou Dynasty of China from 544 to 520 BC.

References